Marcus Higley (born 16 May 1974) is an English professional golfer. He previously played on the European Tour and the Challenge Tour.

Career
Higley turned professional at the young age of 17. He qualified to the Challenge Tour in 2001 and enjoyed a breakthrough year in 2006, recording his first win at the Thomas Bjørn Open and earning a European Tour card for the first time. In his debut season at the highest level, he recorded several top-10 finishes, including a runner-up finish at the dual-sanctioned Open de Saint-Omer. He regained his European Tour card at the first attempt via the 2008 Challenge Tour, but endured a tough season on the full tour due to injury. Despite surgery, in 2012 he retired from the professional golf circuit.

Professional wins (1)

Challenge Tour wins (1)

See also
2006 Challenge Tour graduates
2008 Challenge Tour graduates

External links

English male golfers
European Tour golfers
People from Yeovil
People from Sherborne
Sportspeople from Dorset
1974 births
Living people